Andrei Eduardovich Kuzmin (born 5 April 1981) is a Russian former ice hockey player. He played in the Kontinental Hockey League from 2008 to 2013, while the rest of his career, which lasted from 1998 to 2018, was mainly spent in the lower leagues of Russia.

External links

 

1981 births
Living people
Ak Bars Kazan players
HC Dynamo Moscow players
HC Neftekhimik Nizhnekamsk players
HC Spartak Moscow players
Russian ice hockey left wingers
Torpedo Nizhny Novgorod players
Sportspeople from Penza